Nekkeveld is a hamlet in the Dutch province of Gelderland. It is a part of the municipality of Nijkerk, and lies about 8 km north of Amersfoort.

Nekkeveld is not a statistical entity, and the postal authorities have placed it under Nijkerk. It was first mentioned in 1250 as "in Ekelenvelde", and means field with oak trees. There are no official place name signs, however a farmer has put a sign in its driveway. Nekkeveld consists of about 7 houses.

Gallery

References

Populated places in Gelderland
Nijkerk